This is a list of township-level divisions (formal fourth-level administrative divisions including towns, townships, subdistricts and county districts) of the Xinjiang Uyghur Autonomous Region, People's Republic of China.

Ürümqi

Dabancheng District

Midong District

Saybagh District

Shuimogou District

Tianshan District

Toutunhe District

Xinshi District

Ürümqi County
Anningqu

Aksu Prefecture

Aksu City
Subdistrict (街道)
Langan Subdistrict (栏杆街道), Yinbaza Subdistrict (英巴扎街道), Hongqiao Subdistrict (红桥街道), Xincheng Subdistrict (新城街道), Nancheng Subdistrict (南城街道)
Town (镇)
Kaletale (喀勒塔勒镇), Ayikule (阿依库勒镇)
Township (乡)
Yiganqi Township (依干其乡), Baimetugeman Township (拜什吐格曼乡), Tuopuluke Township (托普鲁克乡), Kumubaxi Township (库木巴希乡), Tuokayi Township (托喀依乡)

Onsu / Wensu County
Towns (بازىرى / 镇):
Wensu Town (Onsu; ئونسۇ بازىرى / 温宿镇), Tumshuq (Tumuxiuke; تۇمشۇق بازىرى / 吐木秀克镇, formerly 吐木秀克乡), Qizil (Kezile; قىزىل بازىرى / 克孜勒镇, formerly 克孜勒乡), Aral (Arele; ئارال بازىرى / 阿热勒镇, formerly 阿热勒乡), Jam (Jiamu; جام بازىرى / 佳木镇, formerly 佳木乡), Tuofuhan (托甫汗镇), Gongqingtuan (共青团镇), Kekeya (柯柯牙镇)

Townships (يېزىسى / 乡):
Toxula Township (Tuohula; توخۇلا يېزىسى / 托乎拉乡), Chaghraq Township (Qiagelake; چاغراق يېزىسى / 恰格拉克乡), Ishlemchi Township (Yixilaimuqi; ئىشلەمچى يېزىسى / 依希来木其乡), Gulawat Township (Gule'awanti; گۈلئاۋات يېزىسى / 古勒阿瓦提乡), Bozdong Kyrgyz Ethnic Township (Bozidun, Baozidun; بوزدۆڭ قىرغىز يېزىسى / 博孜墩柯尔克孜族乡 / 包孜墩柯尔克孜族乡)

Kuchar County

Subdistricts ( / ):
 Reste Subdistrict (Resitan;  / ), Saqsaq Subdistrict (Sakesake;  / ), Yengisheher Subdistrict (Xincheng;  / ), Sherqiy Subdistrict (Dongcheng;  / )

Towns ( / ):
 Uchar (Wuqia;  / ), Alaqagha (Alahage;  / ), Chimen (Qiman;  / ), Dongqotan (Dunkuotan;  / ), Yaqa (Yaha;  / ), Uzun (Wuzun;  / ), Ishxila (Yixihala;  / ), Erbatai

Townships ( / ):
 Uchosteng Township (Yuqiwusitang;  / ), Behishbagh Township (Bixibage;  / ), Xanqitam Township (Hanikatamu;  / ), Aqosteng Township (Akewusitang;  / ), Aghi Township (Age;  / ), Tarim Township (Talimu;  / )

Other areas:
 Kuqa Economic and Technological Development Zone

Xayar County

Towns ( / ):
Xayar Town (Shaya, Shayar;  / ), Toyboldi (Tuoyibaoledi;  / , formerly ), Qizilbayraq (Hongqi;  / , formerly ), Yengimehelle (Yingmaili;  / , formerly ), Xadadong (Hadedun;  / ), Gulbagh (Gulebage;  / , formerly ), Qaylor (Hailou;  / , formerly )

Townships ( / ):
 Nurbagh Township (Nu'erbage;  / ), Tarim Township (Talimu;  / ), Gezqum Township (Gaizikumu;  / ), Yantaqsheher Township (Yangtakexiehai'er;  / )

Other areas
 Xinken Farm, No. 2 Pasture, Xayar Prison, Xayar County Industrial Zone

Toksu County
Towns ( / ):

Townships ( / ):
Peyshenbebazar (Paixianbaibazha;  / ), Ogen (Weigan;  / ), Üchqat (Yuqikate;  / ), Tamtoghraq (Tamutuogelake;  / )

Other areas:
 央塔库都片区管委会乡, 新和县轻工业园区生活区, 新和县物流园区生活区, 新和县新材料园区生活区

Baicheng County
Towns (镇):
Baicheng Town (拜城镇), Terek (铁热克镇)

Townships (乡):
Keyir Township (黑英山乡), Kezil Township (克孜尔乡), Sairam Township (赛里木乡), Tohsun Township (托克逊乡), Yatur Township (亚吐尔乡), Kangqi Township (康旗乡), Bulung Township (布隆乡), Miqigh Township (米吉克乡), Onbash Township (温巴什乡), Qong Kowruk Township (大桥乡), Karabagh Township (老虎台乡)

Uqturpan County
Towns (بازىرى / 镇):
Uqturpan Town (Uchturpan, Wushi; ئۇچتۇرپان بازىرى	/ 乌什镇), Aqyar Township (Aheya; 阿合雅镇, formerly 阿合雅乡), Imam Township (Yimamu; ئىمام بازىرى / 依麻木乡, formerly 依麻木乡)

Townships ( يېزىسى / 乡):
Aqtoqay Township (Aketuohai; ئاقتوقاي يېزىسى / 阿克托海乡), Achatagh Township (Aqiatage; ئاچاتاغ يېزىسى / 阿恰塔格乡), Yakowruk Township (Yakeruike; ياكۆۋرۈك يېزىسى / 亚科瑞克乡), Yengiawat Township (Ying'awati; يېڭىئاۋات يېزىسى / 英阿瓦提乡), Otbeshi Township (Aotebeixi; ئوتبېشى يېزىسى / 奥特贝希乡), Yamansu Kyrgyz Ethnic Township (يامانسۇ قىرغىز يېزىسى / 亚曼苏柯尔克孜族乡)

Awat County

Towns ( / ):
Awat Town (Awati;  / ), Besheriq (Baishi'airike;  / ), Ghoruchol (Wuluquele;  / ), Tamtoghraq (Tamutuogelake;  / ), Yengieriq (Ying'airike;  / )

Townships ( / ):
Aybagh Township (Ayibage;  / ), Dolan Township (Duolang;  / ), Baytoghraq Township (Bagetuolake;  / )

Other areas
 Aksu Prison

Kalpin County

Towns ( / ):
Kalpin Town (Keping, Kelpin,  / ), Gezlik (Gaizilike;  / ), Achal (Aqiale;  / , formerly Achal Township )

Townships ( / ):
Yurchi Township (Yu'erqi;  / ),  Chilan Township (Qilang;  / )

Altay Prefecture

Altay City
Subdistricts (街道)
Jinshan Road Subdistrict (金山路街道) | Jiefang Road Subdistrict (解放路街道) | Tuanjie Road Subdistrict (团结路街道)
	
Town (镇)
 Aweitan (阿苇滩镇) | Hongdu (红墩镇)

Township 乡 	
Qimuerqieke Township (切木尔切克乡) | 阿拉哈克乡 | 汗德尕特蒙古族乡 | 拉斯特乡 | 喀拉希力克乡 | 萨尔胡松乡 | 巴里巴盖乡 | 切尔克齐乡

Others
Kalagashi Ranch 喀拉尕什牧场 | Aketumusike Ranch 阿克吐木斯克牧场 | 兵团181团 | 兵团189团

Burqin County
Town (镇)
 Burqin Town (布尔津镇)
	
Township (乡)
Burqin Township (布尔津乡) | Woyimoke Township (窝依莫克乡) | Dulaiti Township (杜来提乡) | Kuositeke Township (阔斯特克乡) | Chonghuer Township (冲乎尔乡) | Yegezizabie Township (也格孜托别乡)
Ethnic Township (民族乡)
Hemuhanasi Mongol Township (禾木哈纳斯蒙古族乡)

Fuyun County
Town (镇)
Kueerqisi Township (库额尔齐斯镇), Keketuohai Township (可可托海镇), Qiakuertu Township (恰库尔图镇)
	
Township (乡)
Tuerhong Township (吐尔洪乡), Dure Township 杜热乡, Kuerte Township 库尔特乡, Kalatongke Township (喀拉通克乡), Tiemaike Township (铁买克乡), Kalabulegen Township 喀拉布勒根乡

Fuhai County
Town (镇)
 Fuhai Town (福海镇)
	
Township (乡)
Jietearele Township (解特阿热勒乡), Kekeagashi Township (科克阿尕什乡), Qiganjisong Township (齐干吉迭乡), Kalamagai Township (喀拉玛盖乡),  Aerda Township (阿尔达乡)

Others
兵团182团, 兵团183团, 兵团187团, 兵团188团, 兵团190团

Habahe County
Town (镇)
Makeqi 阿克齐镇

Township (乡)
Saertamu Township (萨尔塔木乡) | Jiayilema Township (加依勒玛乡) | Kulebai Township (库勒拜乡) | Saerbulake Township (萨尔布拉克乡) | Tireketi Township (铁热克提乡) | Qiba'er Township (齐巴尔乡)
Others
兵团185团

Qinggil County
Town (镇)
Qinggil Town (青河镇) |  Takeshiken (塔克什肯镇)
Township (乡)
Arele Township (阿热勒乡) | Areletuobie Township (阿热勒托别乡) | Saertuohai Township (萨尔托海乡) | Chaganguole Township (查干郭勒乡) | Agashiaopao Township (阿尕什敖包乡)
Military Base (兵团单位)
Qinghe Farm (青河农场)

Jeminay County
Town (镇)
Tuoputiereke (托普铁热克镇) | Jimunai (吉木乃镇)
Township (乡)
Tuoputiereke Township (托普铁热克乡) | Tuosite Township (托斯特乡) | Qialeshihai Township (恰勒什海乡) | Kaerjiao Township (喀尔交乡) | Biesitiereke Township (别斯铁热克乡)
Others
兵团186团

Aral

Bayingolin Mongol Autonomous Prefecture

Korla City
Subdistrict (街道)
Tuanjie (团结街道) | Sayibage Subdistrict (萨依巴格街道) | Tianshan Subdistrict (天山街道) | Xincheng Subdistrict (新城街道) | Jianshe Road Subdistrict (建设路街道)
Town (镇)
Shanghu (上户镇) | Tashidian, Xinier (西尼尔镇)
Township (乡)
Tiekeqi Township (铁克其乡) | Qiaerbage Township (恰尔巴格乡) | Yingxia Township (英下乡) | Langan Township (兰干乡) | Heshilike Township (和什力克乡) | Halayugong Township (哈拉玉宫乡) | Awati Township (阿瓦提乡) | Tuouliqi Township (托布力其乡) | Puhui Township (普惠乡)
Others
库尔楚园艺场 | 包头湖农场 | 普惠农场 | 阿瓦提农场 | 沙依东园艺场 | 兵团农二师（师部 | 28团场 | 29团场 | 30团场）

Luntai County
Town (镇)
Luntai Town (轮台镇) | Lunnan (轮南镇) | Qunbake (群巴克镇) | Yanxia (阳霞镇	)
Township (乡)
Haerbake Township (哈尔巴克乡) | Yeyungou Township (野云沟乡) | Akesalai Township (阿克萨来乡) | Taerlake Township (塔尔拉克乡) | Caohu Township (草湖乡) | Tierekebaza Township (铁热克巴扎乡) | Cedaya Township (策大雅乡)

Yuli County
Towns (镇)
Yuli Town, Xingping Town (formerly ), Tuanjie Town (formerly )
Township (乡)
Talimu Township, Dunkuotan Township, Ka'erquga Township, Akesupu Township (Akesufu; /), Gulebage Township
Others
兵团团场: 31团场, 32团场, 33团场, 34团场, 35团场

Ruoqiang County

Towns (镇)
Ruoqiang Town, Qilanbulak (Yitunbulake), Luobupo, Tieganlike Township, Waxxari (Washixia)
Townships (乡)
Wutamu Township, Tomorlog Township (Tiemulike), Qimantag Township
Others
兵团36团场

Qiemo County

Towns (镇)
Qiemo Town, Tatrang (Tatirang), Aqqan (Aqiang), Aoyiya Yilake, Tazhong, Aral Township (Arele)
Townships (乡)
Qiongkule Township, Tuogela Keleke Township, Bage Airike Township (Bage'airike), Yengiostang Township (Yingwusitang), Aketi Kandun Township (Aketikandun), Kuoshi Satema Township (Kuoshisatema), Koramlik Township (Kula Muleke),
County Autonomous Regions (县辖区)
Aqiang District (阿羌区)

Others
农二师且末工程支队

Hejing County
Town (镇)
Hejing Town (和静镇) | Baluntai (巴仑台镇) | Barunhaermodun (巴润哈尔莫墩镇) | Haermodun (哈尔莫墩镇)
Township (乡)
Naimenmodun Township (乃门莫墩乡) | Xiebinaierbuhu Township (协比乃尔布呼乡) | Keerguti Township (克尔古提乡) | Alagou Township (阿拉沟乡) | Elezaitewulu Township (额勒再特乌鲁乡) | Bayinguoleng Township (巴音郭愣乡) | Bayinwulu Township (巴音乌鲁乡) | Gongnaisigou Township (巩乃斯沟乡)
Others
乌拉斯台农场 | 和静县钢铁厂 | 兵团（21团场 | 22团场 | 23团场 | 223团场） | 农二师湖光糖厂

Hoxud County
Town (镇	)
Tewulike (特吾里克镇)
Township (乡)
Quhui Township (曲惠乡) | Tahaqi Township (塔哈其乡) | Suhate Township (苏哈特乡) | Nairenkeer Township (乃仁克尔乡)
Ethnic Township (民族乡)
Wushitala Hui Ethnic Township (乌什塔拉回族乡)
Others
Qingshuihe Farm (清水河农场) | Baoertu Ranch (包尔图牧场) |Malan Public Security Controlled Area (马兰公安管区) | 兵团（24团场 | 26团场）

Bohu County
Town (镇)
Bohu Town (博湖镇) | Benbutu (本布图镇)
Township (乡)
Tawenjueken Township (塔温觉肯乡) | Wulanzaigesen Township (乌兰再格森乡) | Caikannuoer Township (才坎诺尔乡) | Chagannuoer Township (查干诺尔乡) | Bositenghu Township (博斯腾湖乡)
Others
兵团25团场

Yanqi Hui Autonomous County
Towns:
Yanqi Town (焉耆镇), Qigxin, Yongning (永宁镇), Sishilichengzi (四十里城子镇)

Townships:
Beidaqu Township (北大渠乡), Wuhaoqu Township (五号渠乡), Qagan Qehe Township (查汗采开乡), Borhoi Township (包尔海乡)

Beitun

Bortala Mongol Autonomous Prefecture

Bole City
Subdistrict (街道)
Qingdeli Subdistrict (青得里街道) | Gulimutu Subdistrict (顾力木图街道) | Keergenzhuo Subdistrict (克尔根卓街道) | Santai Subdistrict (三台街道)
Town (镇)
Xiaoyingpan Town (小营盘镇) | Dalete Town (达勒特镇) | Wutubulage Town (乌图布拉格镇)
Township (乡)
Qingdeli Township (青得里乡) | Balinharimodun Township (贝林哈日莫墩乡)
Others
阿拉山口口岸行政管理区 | 阿热勒托海牧场 | 兵团农五师（81团 | 84团 | 85团 | 86团 | 89团 | 90团） | 香班哈日根牧场

Jinghe County
Town (镇) 	
Jinghe Town (Jing) (精河镇, جىڭ) | Daheyan Town (Dakheyangzi) (大河沿子镇, داخېيەڭزى)
Township (乡) 	
Mangding Township (Mandanbulaq) (茫丁乡, ماندانبۇلاق) | Tuoli Township (Toli) (托里乡, تولى) | Tuotuo Township (Todog) (托托乡, تودوگ)
Others
阿合其农场 | 八家户农场 | 兵团82团 | 兵团83团 | 兵团91团 | 古尔图牧场

Wenquan County
Town (镇)
Bogedaer (博格达尔镇) | Haribuhu (哈日布呼镇)
	
Townships (乡)
Agelige Township (安格里格乡) | Chagantunge Township (查干屯格乡) |  Zalemute Township (扎勒木特乡) |  Taxiu Township (塔秀乡)
Others
 Huhetuoha Breeding Ranch (呼和托哈种畜场) | Kundelun (昆得仑牧场) | 兵团87团 | 兵团88团 | Mengke Ranch (孟克牧场)

Changji Hui Autonomous Prefecture

Changji City
Subdistrict (街道)
Yan'an North Road Subdistrict (延安北路街道), Beijing South Road Subdistrict (北京南路街道), Luzhou Road Subdistrict (绿洲路街道), Zhongshan Road Subdistrict (中山路街道), Ningbian Road Subdistrict (宁边路街道), Jianguo Road Subdistrict(建国路街道)
	
Town (镇)
Liuhuanggou Town (硫磺沟镇) | Sanjiang Town (三工镇) | Yushugou Town (榆树沟镇) | Liujiang Town (六工镇) | Erliugong Town (二六工镇, ئەرليۇگۇڭ) | Daxiqu Town (大西渠镇)
Township (乡)
Dianba Township (佃坝乡) | Binghu Township, Changji (滨湖乡) | Miaoergou Township (庙尔沟乡)
Ethnic Township (民族乡)
Ashili Kazakh Ethic Township (阿什里哈萨克族乡, ئاشىلى)
Others
园艺场 | 共青团农场 | 军户农场 | 下巴湖农场 | 老农河农区 | 林木种苗场 | 良种场 | 水利厅水土改良实验场 | 商务厅农场 | 兵团农六师（师部驻地 | 101团 | 103团）

Fukang City
Subdistrict (街道)
Bofeng Street Subdistrict (博峰街街道) | Fuxin Street Subdistrict (阜新街街道) | Zhundong Subdistrict (准东街道)	
Town (镇)
Ganhezi (甘河子镇) | Chengguan (城关镇) | Jiuyun Street Town (九运街镇)| Ziniquanzi Town (滋泥泉子镇)
Township (乡)
Shuimogou Township (水磨沟乡)
Ethnic Township (民族乡)
Sangonghe Kazakh Ethnic Township (三工河哈萨克族乡) |  Shanghugou Kazakh Ethnic Township (上户沟哈萨克族乡)
Other (其他)
准东石油勘探开发公司 | 阜康市有色管理处 | 阜康市种羊场 | 小泉牧场 | 五宫煤矿 | 农六师土墩子农场 | 六运湖农场 | 兵团222团场

Hutubi County
Town (镇)
Hutubi Town (呼图壁镇, قۇتۇبى) | Dafeng Town (大丰镇, دافېڭ) | Qiaoergou Town (雀尔沟镇) | Nianlidian Town (廿里店镇) | Yunhucun Town (园户村镇) | Wugongtai Town (五工台镇, ۋۇگوڭتەي)
Ethnic Township (民族乡)
Shitizi Kazakh Ethnic Township (石梯子哈萨克民族乡) | Dushanzi Kazakh Ethnic Township (独山子哈萨克族乡)
Other (其他)
南山牧场 | 良种繁育场 | 干河子林场 | 塔勒得牧场 | 林场 | 种牛场 | 种畜场 | 兵团105团 | 兵团106团 | 兵团111团 | 农六师芳草湖总场

Manas County
Town (镇)
Manas Town (玛纳斯镇) | Leduyi Town (乐土驿镇) | Baojiadian Town (包家店镇) | Liangzhouhu Town (凉州户镇) | Beiwucha Town (北五岔镇) | Liuhudi Town (六户地镇) | Lanzhou Bay Town (兰州湾镇)
Township (乡)
Guangdongdi Township (广东地乡)
Ethnic Townships (民族乡)
Qingshuihe Kazakh Ethnic Township清水河哈萨克族乡) | Taxihe Kazakh Ethnic Township (塔西河哈萨克族乡) | Hankkazitan Kazakh Ethnic Township (旱卡子滩哈萨克族乡)
Other (其他)
玛纳斯发电有限责任公司 | 玛纳斯园艺场 | 玛纳斯平原林场 | 农科院玛纳斯试验站 | 农六师新湖农场 | 兵团农八师（147团场 | 148团场 | 149团场 | 150团场）

Qitai County
Town (镇	)
Qitai Town (奇台镇), Laoqitai Town 老奇台镇 | Banjiegou Town (半截沟镇) | Jibuku Town (吉布库镇) | Dongwan Town (东湾镇) | Xidi Town (西地镇)
Township (乡)
Biliuhe Township (碧流河乡) | Xibeiwan Township (西北湾乡) | Kanerzi Township (坎尔孜乡) | Jicheng Township (古城乡) | Qihu Township (七户乡) | Sangezhuangzi Township (三个庄子乡)
Ethnic Townships (民族乡)
Wumachang Kazakh Ethnic Township (五马场哈萨克族乡) | Qiaoren Kazakh Ethnic Township (乔仁哈萨克族乡) | Daquan Tatar Ethnic Township (大泉塔塔尔族乡)
Other (其他)
兵团农六师（108团 | 109团 | 110团 | 奇台农场 | 北塔山牧场）

Jimsar County
镇 	
Jimsar Town (吉木萨尔镇) | Santai Town (三台镇) | Quanzi Street Town (泉子街镇) | Beiting Town (北庭镇)
乡 	
Ergong Township (二工乡) | Qingyang Lake Township (庆阳湖乡) | Laotai Township (老台乡) | Dayou Township (大有乡) | Xindi Township (新地乡)
其他 	
兵团农六师（红旗农场 | 107团）

Mori Kazakh Autonomous County
Town (镇)
Mori Town (木垒镇) | Xijier Town (西吉尔镇) | Dongcheng Town (东城镇)	
Township (乡)
Yinggebao Township (英格堡乡) | Zhaobishan Township (照壁山乡) | Xinhu Township (新户乡) | Qiaoren Township (雀仁乡) | Baiyanghe Township (白杨河乡) | Dashitou Township (大石头乡) | Bositan Township (博斯坦乡)
Ethnic Township (民族乡)
Danangou Uzbek Ethnic Township (大南沟乌孜别克族乡)
Other (其他)
良种场 | 克热克库都克牧场

Hami Prefecture

Kumul City
Subdistrict (街道)
 Donghequ Subdistrict (东河区街道) | Xihequ Subdistrict (西河区街道) | Xinshiqu Subdistrict (新市区街道)| Liyuan Subdistrict (丽园街道) | Shiyouxincheng Subdistrict (石油新城街道)

Town (镇)
Yamansu Town (雅满苏镇) | Xingxingxia Town (星星峡镇, شىڭشىڭشيا بازىرى)  | Erpu Town (Astana) (二堡镇, ئاستانە بازىرى)| Qijuejing Town (Yatta Quduq) (七角井镇, يەتتە قۇدۇق بازىرى)

Township (乡)
Qincheng Township (沁城乡)| Wulatai Kazakh Township (Olatay) (乌拉台哈萨克乡, ئۇلاتاي قازاق يېزىسى) | Shuangjingzi Township (双井子乡)| Daquanwan Township (Bulung Toghraq) (大泉湾乡, بۇلۇڭ توغراق يېزىسى)| Dewaidurukeske Township (Dawalduruk) (德外都如克萨克乡, دەۋەلدۈرۈك يېزىسى) | Taojiagong Township (陶家宫乡)| Huicheng Township (回城乡)| Huayuan Township (花园乡) | Nanhu Township (南湖乡)| Wubao Township (五堡乡)| Xishan Township (Shishan) (西山乡, شىشەن يېزىسى) | Tianshan Township (天山乡)| Baishitou Township (白石头乡)| Chengjiao Township (城郊乡) | Liushugou Township (柳树沟乡)

Yiwu County
Town (镇)
Yiwu Town (伊吾镇) | Naomaohu Town (淖毛湖镇)	
Township (乡)
Weizixia Township (苇子峡乡) | Xiamaya Township (下马崖乡) | Yanchi Township (盐池乡) | Tuhulu Township (吐葫芦乡)
Ethnic Township (民族乡)
Qianshan Kazakh Ethnic Township (前山哈萨克族乡)
Other (其他)
兵团淖毛湖农场

Barkol Kazakh Autonomous County
Town (镇)
Balikun Town (巴里坤镇) | Boerqiangji Town (博尔羌吉镇) | Dahe Town (大河镇) | Kuisu Town (奎苏镇)
Township (乡)
Saerqiaoke Township (萨尔乔克乡) | Haiziyan Township (海子沿乡) | Xialaoba Township (下涝坝乡) | Shirenzi Township (石人子乡) | Huayuan Township (花园乡) | Santanghu Township (三塘湖乡) | Dahongliuxia Township (大红柳峡乡) | Baqiangzi Township (八墙子乡)
Other (其他)
兵团红山农场 | 兵团淖毛湖农场 | 红星一牧场良种繁育场

Hotan Prefecture

Hotan City
The city includes three subdistricts, three towns, five townships and two other areas:

Subdistricts:
 Nurbag Subdistrict (Nu'erbage), Gujanbagh Subdistrict (Gujiangbage), Gulbagh Subdistrict (Gulebage), Na'erbage Subdistrict,

Towns:
 Laskuy (Lasikui;  / ), Yurungqash (Yulongkashi;  / ), Tusalla (Tushala;  / )

Townships:
 Shorbagh Township (Xiao'erbage;  / ), Ilchi Township (Yiliqi;  / ), Gujanbagh Township (Gujiangbage;  / ), Jiya Township ( / ), Aqchal Township (Akeqiale  / )

Others:
 Beijing Industrial Park, Hotan City Jinghe Logistics Park

Hotan County
Two towns:
 Baghchi (Bageqi;  / ), Hanerik (Han'airike, Khaneriq;  / )

Ten townships:
 Yengiawat (Ying'awati;  / ), Yengierik (Ying'airike;  / ), Buzaq (Buzhake;  / ), Layka (Layika, Layqa;  / ), Langru ( / ), Tewekkul (Tawakule;  / ), Islamawat (Yisilamu'awati;  / ), Seghizkol (Segezi Kule;  / ), Qashteshi (Kashitashi;  / ), Uzunsho (Wuzongxiao;  / )

One other area:
 Hotan County Economic New Area

Karakax/Moyu County

Towns:
 Karakax (Kalakashi;  / ), Zawa (Zhawa;  / ), Kuya (Kuiya;  / ), Qarasaz (Ka'ersai;  / ), Purchaqchi (Puqiakeqi;  / , formerly  / )

Townships:
 Aqsaray (Akesalayi;  / ), Urchi (Wu'erqi;  / ), Tohula (Tuohula, Tuxula; / ), Saybag (Sayibage, Saywagh;  / ), Jahanbagh (Jiahan Bage;  / ), Manglay (Manglai;  / ), Qochi (Kuoyiqi;  / ), Yawa ( / ), Tüwat (Tuwaite, Tüwet;  /  ), Yéngiyer (Yingye'er;  / ), Kawak (Kawake;  / )

Other areas:
Regiment 417, Regiment 224

Yutian/Keriya County
Two towns:
Keriya Town (Mugala;  / ), Xambabazar (Xianbai Bazha;  / )
Thirteen townships:
Jay (Jiayi;  / ), Kokyar (Kekeya;  / ), Aral (Arele;  / ), Arix (Arixi;  / ), Bogazlanggar (Langan;  / ), Siyek (Siyeke;  / ), Tagdaxman (Tuogeri Gazi;  / ), Karaki (Kalake'er, Qarqi;  / ), Oytograk (Aoyituo Gelake, Oytoghraq;  / ), Aqqan (Aqiang, Achchan;  / ), Yengibag (Yingbage;  / ), Shiwol (Xiwule;  / ), Darya Boyi (Daliya Buyi, Deryaboyi;  / )
Others:
 National (Kunlun) Sheep Farm (国营（昆仑）种羊场), Yutian Prison (于田监狱), Regiment 225 (兵团二二五团)

Lop/Luopu County

One subdistrict:
 Chengqu Subdistrict

Three towns:
 Lop (Luopu;  / ), Sampul (Shanpulu;  / ), Hanggiya (Hanggui;  / )

Six townships:
 Buya ( / ), Charbagh (Qia'erbage;  / ), Dol (Duolu;  / ), Nawa ( / ), Beshtoghraq (Baishi Tuogelake;  / ), Aqqik (Aqike, Achchiq;  / )

Three others areas:
 Seed Farm, Lop County Beijing Agricultural Science and Technology Demonstration Park Area, Lop County Beijing Industry Park

Minfeng/Niya County

Town:
Niya Town (Niye;  / )
Townships:
Niye (Niya;  / ), Rokiya (Ruokeya, Rukiya;  / ), Salgozak (Salewuzeke, Salghozek;  / ), Yeyik (Yeyike, Yëyiq, Ya-li-ka, Yeh-i-k'o;  / ), Andir (Andi'er, Endir;  / ), Yawatongguz (Yawatongguzi, Yawa Tongguz;  / )

Pishan/Guma County

Subdistrict:
 Pishan County Subdistrict

Towns:
 Guma ( / ), Duwa ( / ), Xaidulla (Saitula, Sheydulla;  / ), Muji ( / ), Koxtag (Kuoshitage, Qoshtagh;  / ), Sanju (Sangzhu;  / )

Townships:
 Kiliyang (Keliyang;  / ), Kokterak (Keketiereke, Köktërek;  / ), Choda (Qiaoda;  / ), Mokoyla (Mukuila;  / ), Zangguy (Canggui;  / ), Piyalma (Piyalema;  / ), Pixna (Pixina, Pishna;  / ), Bashlengger (Bashilangan;  / ), Nawabat Tajik Township (Nao'abati;  / ), Kangkir Kyrgyz Township (Kangke'er, Kengqir;  / )

Others:
 Pishan Sanxia Industrial Park, Pishan Regiment Farm

Qira County
Towns:
Qira (Cele, Chira;  / ), Gulakhma (Gulahama;  / )

Townships:
Qira (Cele, Chira;  / ), Damiku (Damagou;  / ), Qaka  (Qiaha, Chaqa;  / ), Ulughsay (Wulukesayi;  / ), Nur (Nu'er, Nuri;  / ), Bostan (Bositan;  / )

Ili Kazakh Autonomous Prefecture

Yining City
Subdistrict (街道)
 Sayibuyi Subdistrict(萨依布依街道)|Dunmaili Subdistrict(墩买里街道)|Yili He Lu Subdistrict(伊犁河路街道)|Kazanqi Subdistrict(喀赞其街道)|Doulaitibage Subdistrict(都来提巴格街道)|Qiongkeruike Subdistrict(琼科瑞克街道)|Ailanmubage Subdistrict(艾兰木巴格街道)|Jiefang Lu Subdistrict(解放路街道)

Kuitun City
Subdistrict (街道)	
 Tuanjie Road Subdistrict (团结路街道) | Ürümqi East Road Subdistrict (乌鲁木齐东路街道) | Beijing Road Subdistrict (北京路街道) | Ürümqi West Road Subdistrict (乌鲁木齐西路街道) | Train Station Subdistrict (火车站街道)
Town (乡)
Kanganqi Township (开干齐乡)
Others
兵团131团

Yining County
Town (镇	)
Jiliyuzi (吉里于孜镇) | Dunmaza (墩麻扎镇)
Township (乡)
Hudiyayuzi Township (胡地亚于孜乡) | Tulupanyuzi Township (吐鲁番于孜乡) | Kalayagaqi Township (喀拉亚尕奇乡) | Arewusitang Township (阿热吾斯塘乡) | Yingtamu Township (英塔木乡) | Bayituohai Township (巴依托海乡) | Weiwueryuqiwen Township (维吾尔玉其温乡) | Samuyuzi Township (萨木于孜乡) | Kashi Township (喀什乡) | Maza Township (麻扎乡) | Wenyaer Township (温亚尔乡) | Awuliya Township (阿乌利亚乡) | Quluhai Township (曲鲁海乡) | Wugong Township (武功乡) | Sadikeyuzi Township (萨地克于孜乡)
Ethnic Township (民族乡)
Yuqunwen Hui Ethnic Township (愉群翁回族乡)
Others
Qingnian Farm (青年农场) |Duolang Farm (多浪农场) | 农四师（兵团70团 | Baishidun Farm (拜什墩农场）)

Huocheng County
Town (镇)
Shuiding Town (水定镇) | Qingshuihe Town (Chingsikhoza) (清水河镇, چىڭسىخوزا) | Lucaogou Town (Losigung) (芦草沟镇, لوسىگۇڭ) | Huiyuan Town (惠远镇) | Saerbulake Town (萨尔布拉克镇)
Town (乡)
Langan Township (兰干乡) | Sandaohe Township (三道河乡) | Sangong Hui Ethnic Township (三宫回族乡) | Daxigou Township (Dashigu) (大西沟乡, داشىگۇ)
Ethnic Township (民族乡)
Yichegashan Xibo Ethnic Township (Yichegashan) (伊车嘎善锡伯族乡, يىچېگاشەن)
Other (其他)
格干沟牧场 | 莫乎尔牧场 | 果子沟牧场 | 霍城县良种繁育场 | 霍尔果斯海关口岸 | 兵团61团 | 兵团62团 | 兵团63团 | 兵团64团 | 兵团65团 | 兵团66团

Tokkuztara County
Town (镇)
Tokkuztara Town (巩留镇)
Township (乡)
Mohuer Township (莫乎尔乡) | Jiergelang Township (吉尔格郎乡) |Agaersen Township (阿尕尔森乡) | Dongmaili Township (东买里乡) | Tasituobie Township (塔斯托别乡) | Tikeareke Township (提克阿热克乡) | Aketubieke Township (阿克吐别克乡)
Other (其他)
巩留县综合农场 | 阔什阿朵什羊场 | 巩留县牛场 | 良凡场 | 恰西鹿场 | 巩留县林场 | 莫乎尔农场 | 巩留县核桃林场 | 兵团73团

Künes County
Town (镇)
Künes Town (新源镇) |Areletuobie Town ( 阿热勒托别镇) | Talede Town (塔勒德镇) | Nalati Town (那拉提镇) | Xiaoerbulake Town (肖尔布拉克镇)

Township (乡)
Kansu Township (坎苏乡) | Kalabula Township (喀拉布拉乡) | Alemale Township (阿勒玛勒乡) | Tuergen Township (吐尔根乡)
Other (其他)
巩乃斯种羊场 | 兵团71团 | 兵团72团

Zhaosu County
Town (镇)
Zhaosu Town (昭苏镇)
Township (乡)
Hongnahai Township (洪纳海乡) | Wuzunbulake Township (乌尊布拉克乡) | Akedala Township (阿克达拉乡) | Saerkuobu Township (萨尔阔布乡) | Kaxiajiaer Township (喀夏加尔乡) | Kalasu Township (喀拉苏乡)
Ethnic Township (民族乡)
Chahanwusu Mongol Ethnic Township (察汗乌苏蒙古族乡) | Xiate Krghiz Ethnic Township (夏特柯尔克孜族乡) | Husongtukaerxun Mongol Ethnic Township (胡松图喀尔逊蒙古族乡)
Other (其他)
Zhongyang Ranch (种羊场) | 阿合牙孜牧场 | 种马场 | 天山西部林业局昭苏林场 | 军马场 | 煤矿 | 农四师（74团 | 75团 | 76团 | 77团

Tekes County
Town (镇	)
Tekes Town (特克斯镇)
Township (乡)
Kekesu Township (科克苏乡) | Qilewuzeke Township (齐勒乌泽克乡) | Qilaketiereke Township (乔拉克铁热克乡) | Kaladala Township (喀拉达拉乡) | Kalatuohai Township (喀拉托海乡)
Ethnic Township (民族乡)
Hujierte Mongol Ethnic Township (呼吉尔特蒙古族乡) | Kuoketiereke Kyrghiz Ethnic Township (阔克铁热克柯尔克孜族乡)
Other (其他)
托斯曼牧场 | 萨尔阔布牧场 | 克孜勒布拉克牧场 | 喀拉达拉牧场 | 特克斯军马场 | 科克苏林场 | 农四师78团

Nilka County
Town (镇)
Nilka Town (尼勒克镇)
Township (乡)
Subutai Township (苏布台乡) | Kalasu Township (喀拉苏乡) | Jiahawulasitai Township (加哈乌拉斯台乡) | Nilka Wuzan Township (尼勒克乌赞乡) | Wulasitai Township (乌拉斯台乡) | Keling Township (克令乡) | Kalatuobie Township (喀拉托别乡) | Hujiertai Township (胡吉尔台乡) | Musi Township (木斯乡)
Ethnic Township (民族乡)
科克浩特浩尔蒙古族乡
Others
阿克塔斯牧场 | 良种繁育场 | 军马场 | 林场 | 种蜂场 | 兵团79团

Qapqal Xibe Autonomous County
Town (镇)
 Qapqal Town (察布查尔镇) | Aixinsheli Town (爱新舍里镇)
Township (乡)
Duiqiniulu Township (堆齐牛录乡) | Sunzaqiniulu Township (孙扎齐牛录乡) | Chaohuoer Township (绰霍尔乡) | Nadaqiniulu Township (纳达齐牛录乡) | Zakuqiniulu Township (扎库齐牛录乡) | Kan Township (坎乡) | Kuohongqi Township (阔洪奇乡) | Hainuke Township (海努克乡) | Jiagasitai Township (加尕斯台乡) | Qiongbola Township (琼博拉乡)
Ethnic Township (民族乡)
Miliangquan Hui Ethnic Township (米粮泉回族乡)
Others
良种繁育场 | 奶牛场 | 平原林场 | 山区林场 | 兵团67团 | 兵团68团 | 兵团69团

Karamay

Baijiantan District

Dushanzi District

Karamay District

Urho District

Kashgar Prefecture

Kashgar City

Subdistricts ( / )
Chasa Subdistrict (Qiasa;  / ),  Yawagh Subdistrict (Yawage;  / ),  Östeng Boyi Subdistrict (Wusitangboyi;  / ), Qum Derwaza Subdistrict (Kumudai'erwazha;  / ), Gherbiz Yurt Avenue Subdistrict (Xiyu Dadao;  / ), Sherqiy Köl Subdistrict (Donghu;  / ), Merhaba Avenue Subdistrict (Yingbin Dadao;  / ), Gherbiz Baghcha Subdistrict (Xigongyuan;  / )

Towns ( / )
Nezerbagh (Naize'erbage;  / ; formerly ), Shamalbagh (Xiamalebage;  / ; formerly )
	
Townships ( / )
Döletbagh Township (Duolaitebage;  / ), Qoghan Township (Haohan;  / ), Semen Township (Seman;  / ), Xangdi Township (Huangdi;  / ), Beshkërem Township (Baishikeranmu;  / ), Paxtekle Township (Pahataikeli;  / ), Awat Township (Awati;  / ), Yëngi’östeng Township (Yingwusitan;  / ), Aqqash Township (Akekashi;  / )

Shufu County

Towns ( / )
Toqquzaq (Tuokezhake;  / ), Lengger (Langan;  / ), Oghusaq (Wukusake;  / ), Opal (Wupa'er;  / ) 
	
Townships ( / )
 Tashmiliq Township (Tashimilike;  / ), Tërim Township (Tierimu;  / ), Bulaqsu Township (Bulakesu;  / ), Saybagh Township (Sayibage;  / ), Zemin Township (Zhanmin;  / ), Mush Township (Mushi;  / )

Others
 县种畜场, 县园艺场, 县林场, 县良种场, 疏附广州工业城

Shule County

Towns ( / )
Yengisheher Town (Shule;  /), Hanerik (Hannanlike;  / ), Yapchan (Yafuquan;  / )
	
Townships ( / )
Barin Township (Baren;  / ), Yanduma Township (Yandaman;  / ), Yamanyar Township (Yamanya;  / ), Baghchi Township (Baheqi;  / ), Tazghun Township (Tazihong;  / ), Yengierik Township (Ying'erlike;  / ), Kumusherik Township (Kumuxilike;  / ), Tagharchi Township (Taga'erqi;  / ), Ermudun Township (Ai'ermudong;  / ), Aral Township (Alali;  / ), Harap Township (Alilafu;  / ), Yengiawat Township (Yingawati;  / )

Others
Linchang (林场)| Liangzhong Farm (良种场) | Zhongchu Farm (种畜场) | Yuanyi Fields (园艺场) | Canzhong Farm (蚕种场) | Shuichan Farm (水产场) | Fengchang 蜂场 | XPCC 41 base (兵团41团)

Yengisar County

Town ( / )
Yengisar Town (Yingjisha;  / ), Ulughchat Township (Wuqia;  / , formerly 乌恰乡), Mangshin Township (Mangxin; 芒辛镇, formerly  / )
Township ( / )
Sheher Township (Chengguan;  / ), Cholpan Township (Qiaolepan;  / ), Lompa Township (Longfu;  / ), Siyitle Township (Setili; 色提力乡), Saghan Township (Sahan; 萨罕乡), Yengiyer Township (Yingye'er; 英也尔乡), Qizil Township (Kezile;  / ), Topluq Township (Tuopuluke;  / ), Soget Township (Sugaiti;  / ), Egus Township (Aigusi;  / ), Egizyer Township (Yigeziye'er;  / )
Others
Yengisar County Dongfeng Farm (英吉沙县东风农场)

Poskam / Zepu County
Towns ( / )
Poskam Town (Zepu;  / ), Küybagh Town (Kuiyibage;  / )
Townships ( / )
Poskam Township (Bosikamu;  / ), Zhima Township (Yima;  / ), Gülbagh Township (Gulebage;  / ), Seyli Township (Saili;  / ), Ikkisu Township (Yikesu;  / ), Tughchi Township (Tuhuqi;  / ), Aqtam Township (Aketamu;  / ), Aykol Township (Ayikule, Ayköl;  / ), Küybagh Township (Kuiyibage;  / ), Buyluq Tajik Ethnic Township (Buyiluke;  /  / ), Tong'an Township
County-controlled district (县辖区)
Kuiyibage District (奎依巴格区)

Shache County

County controlled District (县辖区)
Tuomuwusitang District (托木吾斯塘区) | Yishikuli District (伊什库力区) | Wudalike District (乌达力克区) | Huoshilapu District (霍什拉甫区) | Awati District (阿瓦提区) | Ailixihu District (艾力西湖区) | Baishikante District (白什坎特区)
	
Town (镇)	
Shache Town (莎车镇) | Reke Town (热克镇) | Awati Town (阿瓦提镇) | Ailixihu Town (艾力西湖镇) | Huangdi Town (荒地镇) | Baishikante Town (白什坎特镇) | Yigaierqi Town (依盖尔其镇)
Township (乡) 	
Gulepage Township (古勒巴格乡) | Tuomuwusitang Township (托木吾斯塘乡) | Yingyusitang Township (英吾斯塘乡) | Arele Township (阿热勒乡) | Qiaerbage Township (恰尔巴格乡) | Yishikuli Township (伊什库力乡) | Mixia Township (米夏乡) | Tagaersi Township (塔尕尔其乡) | Paikeqi Township (拍克其乡) | Wudalike Township (乌达力克乡) | Aersilanbage Township (阿尔斯兰巴格乡) | Yakaairike Township (亚喀艾日克乡) | Kaqun Township (喀群乡) | Huoshilapu Township (霍什拉甫乡) | Damusi Township (达木斯乡) | Alamaiti Township (阿拉买提乡) | Atuotibage Township (阿扎提巴格乡) | Kuoshiairike Township (阔什艾日克乡) | Dunbagexiang Township (墩巴格乡乡) | Bageawati Township (巴格阿瓦提乡) | Kalasu Township (喀拉苏乡)
Ethnic Townships (民族乡)
孜热甫夏提塔吉克族乡 Zerepshat Tajik township
Other (其他)
莎车农场 | 莎车县良种场 | 莎车县国营农场 | 喀什监狱
莎车县各县辖区管辖乡镇
Tuomuwusitang District (托木吾斯塘区)
古勒巴格乡 | 托木吾斯塘乡 | 英吾斯塘乡 | 阿热勒乡 | 恰尔巴格乡
Tuomuwusitang District (托木吾斯塘区)
伊什库力乡 | 米夏乡 | 塔尕尔其乡 | 拍克其乡
Wudalike District (乌达力克区)
热克镇 | 乌达力克乡 | 阿尔斯兰巴格乡 | 亚喀艾日克乡 | 孜热甫夏提塔吉克族乡
Huoshilafu District (霍什拉甫区)
喀群乡 | 霍什拉甫乡 | 达木斯乡
Awat District (阿瓦提区)
Awat Town (阿瓦提镇) | Alamaiti Township (阿拉买提乡) | Azatibage Township (阿扎提巴格乡)
Aili West Lake District (艾力西湖区)
Ailixihu Town (艾力西湖镇) | Huangdi Town (荒地镇) | Kuoshiairike Township (阔什艾日克乡) | Dunbage Township (墩巴格乡)
Baishikan Special District (白什坎特区)
白什坎特镇 | 依盖尔其镇 | 巴格阿瓦提乡 | 喀拉苏乡

Kargilik/Yecheng County
Town (بازىرى / 镇)
Kargilik Town (Kageleke, Qaghiliq; قاغىلىق بازىرى / 喀格勒克镇), Charbagh Town (Qia'erbage; چارباغ بازىرى / 恰尔巴格镇), Ushsharbash Town (Wuxiabashi; ئۇششارباش بازىرى / 乌夏巴什镇; also Wuxiakebashi 乌夏克巴什镇)
Township (يېزىسى / 乡) 	
Loq Township (Luoke; لوق يېزىسى / 洛克乡), Besheriq Township (Baxireke; بەشئېرىق يېزىسى / 伯西热克乡), Tetir Township (Tieti; تېتىر يېزىسى / 铁提乡), Chasa Meschit Township (Qiasameiqite; چاسا مەسچىت يېزىسى / 恰萨美其特乡), Tögichi Township (Tuguqi; تۆگىچى يېزىسى / 吐古其乡), Janggilieski Township (Jianggelesi; جاڭگىلىئەسكى يېزىسى / 江格勒斯乡), Jayterak Township (Jianongtileke, Janyterek;  / 加依提勒克乡), Barin Township (Baren; بارىن يېزىسى / 巴仁乡), Ghojaeriq Township (Wujireke; غوجائېرىق يېزىسى / 乌吉热克乡), Shaxap Township (Xiahefu; شاخاپ يېزىسى / 夏合甫乡), Yilqichi Township (Yilikeqi; يىلقىچى يېزىسى / 依力克其乡), Yitimliqum Township (Yitimukong; يىتىملىقۇم يېزىسى / 依提木孔乡), Zunglang Township (Zonglang; زۇڭلاڭ يېزىسى / 宗朗乡), Kokyar Township (Kekeya; كۆكيار يېزىسى / 柯克亚乡), Shixshu Township (Xihexiu; شىخشۇ يېزىسى / 西合休乡), Chipan Township (Qipan; چىپان يېزىسى / 棋盘乡), Saybagh Township (Sayibage; سايباغ يېزىسى / 萨依巴格乡)
Others (其他)
兵团叶城牧场 | 阿克塔什农场 | 普萨牧场 | 叶城县公安农场 | 叶城县良种场 | 叶城县园艺场 | 叶城县林场 | 叶城县种畜场

Makit County
Towns (بازىرى / 镇)

Makit Town (Maigaiti;  / ), Bazarjemi (Bazajiemi;  / , formerly a township  / )

Townships (يېزىسى / 乡)
Shehitdong Township (Xiyitidun;  / ), Yantaq Township (Yangtake;  / ), Tumental Township (Tumantale;  / ), Ghazkol Township (Gazikule;  / ), Qizilawat Township (Kezileawati;  / ), Qumqisar Township (Kumukusa'er;  / ), Hangghitliq Township (Anggeteleke;  / ), Qurma Township (Ku'erma;  / )

Others
五一林场, 胡杨林场, 良种场, 园艺场, 兵团43团, 兵团45团, 兵团46团, 农三师前进水库管理处

Yopurga County
Town (镇)
Yopurga Town (岳普湖镇) | Aiximai (艾西买镇)
Township (乡)
Yopurga Township (岳普湖乡) | Yekexianbaibaza Township (也克先拜巴扎乡) | Aqike Township (阿其克乡) | Seyeke Township (色也克乡) | Tieremu Township (铁热木乡) | Bayiawati Township (巴依阿瓦提乡) | Agonglukumu Township (阿洪鲁库木乡)
Others
兵团42团

Peyziwat / Payziwat / Jiashi County

Towns ( / 镇)
Townships ( / 乡)
Terim Township (Tierimu;  / ), Yengimehelle Township (Yingmaili;  / ), Janbaz Township (Jiangbazi;  / ), Misha Township (Mixia;  / ), Qizilsu Township (Kezilesu;  / ), Gulluk Township (Guleluke;  / ), Ordeklik Township (Yudaikelike;  / )
Others
Nongsanshijiashizong Farm (农三师伽师总场)

Maralbexi County/Bachu County
Town (镇)
Maralbeshi (Bachu Town;  / 巴楚镇), Seriqbuya (Selibuya;  / 色力布亚镇), Awat (Awati;  / 阿瓦提镇), Achal (Sanchakou;  / 三岔口镇)
Township (乡)
 Charbagh Township (Qiaerbage;  / 恰尔巴格乡), Doletbagh Township (Duolaitibage;  / 多来提巴格乡), Anakule Township (阿纳库勒乡), Shamal Township (Xiamale;  / 夏玛勒乡), Aqsaqmaral Township (Akesakemarele;  / 阿克萨克马热勒乡), Alaghir Township (Alage'er;  / 阿拉格尔乡), Chongqurchaq (Qiongkuerqiake;  / 琼库尔恰克乡), Yengiosteng Township (Yingwusitang;  / 英吾斯塘乡)
Others
Xiahe Forest Plantation (下河林场), 兵团48团, 兵团52团

Taxkorgan Tajik Autonomous County
Town (镇)
Taxkorgan Town (塔什库尔干镇) | Tajikeabati (塔吉克阿巴提镇)

Townships (乡)
Tashikuergan Township (塔什库尔干乡) | Taheman Township (塔合曼乡) | Tizinafu Township (提孜那甫乡) | Dabudaer Township (达布达尔乡) | Maeryang (马尔洋乡) | Waqia Township (瓦恰乡) | Bandier Township (班迪尔乡) | Kukexiluge Township (库科西鲁格乡) | Bulunmusha Township (布伦木沙乡) | Datong Township (大同乡)

Ethnic Townships (民族乡)
Kekeyaerkeerkezi Ethnic Township (科克亚尔柯尔克孜族乡)
Others
Mazaer Sheep Farm (麻扎尔种羊场) | Bazadashi Forest Station (巴扎达什牧林场) | Dairy Farm (牛奶场) | Buhouyijilafu Farm (布候依吉拉甫农场)

Kizilsu Kirghiz Autonomous Prefecture

Artux

Subdistricts ( / ):
Bext Avenue Subdistrict (Xingfu Lu;  / ), Nurluq Avenue Subdistrict (Guangming Lu;  / ), Xincheng Subdistrict

Town ( / ):
Ustun Atush (Shang'atushi;  / )

Townships ( / ):
Süntag (Songtake, Suntagh;  / ), Azak (Azhake, Azaq;  / ), Agu (Ahu, Aghu;  / ), Katyaylak (Gedaliang, Kattaylaq;  / ),  Karajül (Halajun, Karajol, Qarajol;  / ), Tugurmiti (Tugumaiti;  / )

Other areas:
Bingtuan Nongsanshi Hongqi Farm

Akto County
Town (镇)
Akto Town (阿克陶镇) | Oytak (奥依塔克镇)
	
Townships (乡)	
Ujme Township (玉麦乡) | Pilal Township (皮拉力乡) | Barin Township (巴仁乡) | Karakeqik Township (喀热克其克乡) | Jamaterek Township (加马铁力克乡) | Muji Township (木吉乡) | Bulungkol (布伦口乡) | Kizilto Township (克孜勒陶乡) | Qarlung Township (恰尔隆乡) | Kosrap Township (库斯拉甫乡)

Ethnic Townships (民族乡)
Tar Tajik Township (塔尔塔吉克族乡)
Others
Tortayi Farm (托尔塔依农场) | Akdala Ranch (阿克达拉牧场) | Akto Signature Animal Nursery (阿克陶县原种场) | Duolaitibulake Pedigree Sheep Farm (多来提布拉克种羊场) | Kizilsu Forest Farm (克(孜勒苏柯尔克孜自治州林场) | Akto Plant Nursery (克孜勒苏柯尔克孜自治州苗甫)

Akqi County
Town (镇)
Akqi Town (阿合奇镇)
Townships (乡)
 Kulansarak (库兰萨日克乡) | Saparbay (色帕巴依乡) | Somtax (苏木塔什乡) | Karaqi (哈拉奇乡) | Karabulak (哈拉布拉克乡)
Others
阿合奇县国营马场 | 阿合奇县食品牧场 | 阿合奇县良种场

Ulugqat County
Towns (镇)
 Wuqia | Kangsu 
Townships (乡)
 Baykurut|Boritokay|Bostanterak )|Jigin|Kiziloy|Oksalur|Terak|Toyun|Ulugqat
others
Toyun Ranch|乌恰县国营羊场

Shihezi

Tacheng Prefecture

Tacheng City
Subdistrict (街道)
Heping Subdistrict (和平街道) |  Dubieke Subdistrict (杜别克街道) |  Xincheng Subdistrict (新城街道)
	
Town (镇)
Ergong (二工镇)

Townships (乡)
喀拉哈巴克乡 | Qiaxia Township (恰夏乡) | 阿不都拉乡 | Yemenle Township (也门勒乡)

Ethnic Townships (民族乡)
Axier Dawoer Township (阿西尔达斡尔族乡)

Other (其他单位)
恰合吉牧场 | 博孜达克农场 | 窝依加依劳牧场 | 塔城地区种牛场 | 叶尔盖提兵团162团 | 阿克乔克兵团163团 | 乌拉斯台兵团164团

Wusu City
Subdistrict (街道)
Xinshiqu Subdistrict (新市区街道),  Nanyuan Subdistrict (南苑街道), Xichengqu Subdistrict 西城区街道, Hongqiao Subdistrict (虹桥街道), Kuihe Subdistrict (奎河街道)
Town (镇)
Baiyanggou (白杨沟镇), Hatubuhu (哈图布呼镇), Huanggong (皇宫镇), Chepaizi (车排子镇), Ganhezi (甘河子镇), Baiquan (Baychuan) (百泉镇, بەيچۇەن),  Sikeshu (Chigshor) (四棵树镇, چىگشور),  Guertu (Gürt) (古尔图镇, گۈرت),  Xihu (西湖镇), Xidagou (Shidagu) (西大沟镇, شىداگۇ)
Townships 乡 	
Bashisihu Township (八十四户乡), Jiahezi Township (夹河子乡), Jiujianlou Township (九间楼乡), Shiqiao Township (石桥乡),  Toutai Township (头台乡)
Ethnic townships (民族乡)
Jiergeleteguole Mongol Township (吉尔格勒特郭愣蒙古族乡), Tabulehete Mongol Township (塔布勒合特蒙古族乡)
Others
Ganjia Lake Ranch (甘家湖牧场), Bayingou Ranch (巴音沟牧场), Saileketi Ranch (赛力克提牧场), Wusu Prison (乌苏监狱), Ganjia Lake Forest Area 甘家湖林场, 兵团123团, 兵团124团, 兵团125团, 兵团126团, 兵团127团, 兵团128团, 兵团130团

Emin County
Town (镇)
Emin Town (额敏镇)
	
Townships (乡)
Jiaoqu Township (郊区乡) | Shanghu Township (上户乡) | Yushikalasu Township (玉什喀拉苏乡) | Jieleagashi Township (杰勒阿尕什乡) | Marelesu Township (玛热勒苏乡) | Kagalayemule Township (喀拉也木勒乡) | Lamazhao Township (喇嘛昭乡) | Erdaoqiao Township (二道桥乡)

Ethnic Townships (民族乡)
Emaleguoleng Mongol Township (额玛勒郭楞蒙古族乡) |  Huojierte Mongol Township (霍吉尔特蒙古族乡)

Others
Erzhihe Ranch (二支河牧场) | Jiaerbulake Farm (加尔布拉克农场) | Kuoshibike Pedigree Ranch (阔什比克良种场) | Saeryemule Ranch (萨尔也木勒牧场) | Yemule Ranch (也木勒牧场) | Tachengyequ Pedigree Sheep Farm (塔城地区种羊场) | Wuzongbulake Ranch (吾宗布拉克牧场) | Shuifeng army regiment farm (水丰兵团团结农场) | Nongjiushi 农九师（红星岗兵团169团 | 锡伯提兵团166团 | 麦海因兵团167团 | 乌什水兵团168团 | 达因苏兵团165团）

Shawan County
Town (镇)
Sadohezi (三道河子镇) | Sidaohezi (四道河子镇) |  Laoshawan (老沙湾镇)  |  Wulanwusu (Ulan'us) (乌兰乌苏镇, ئۇلانئۇس) | Anjihai (Yansikhay) (安集海镇, يەنسىخەي) | Dongwan (东湾镇) |  Sigebi (西戈壁镇)| Liumaowan (柳毛湾镇) | Jingouhe 金沟河镇
Township (乡)
Shanghudi Township (商户地乡) | Daquan Township (大泉乡) | Boertonggu Township (博尔通古乡)
Others
Cattle Circle Ranch (牛圈子牧场) | Boertonggu Ranch (博尔通古牧场) |  Shawanxian Pedigree Ranch (沙湾县良种场)| 兵团121团 | 兵团122团 | 兵团123团 | 兵团133团 | 兵团134团 | 兵团135团 | 兵团141团 | 兵团142团 | 兵团143团 | 兵团144团 | 兵团151团

Toli County
Town (镇)
Toli Town (托里镇) | Tieguanggou (铁厂沟镇) |  Miaoergou (庙尔沟镇)
	
Township (乡)
Duolate Township (多拉特乡)  |  Wuxuete Township (乌雪特乡)|  Kupu Township (库普乡)|  Ahkebielidou Township (阿克别里斗乡)

Others
 Baiyanghe Forest station (白杨河林场) |  Laofengkou Forest station (老风口林场)|  Baerlukeshantasi Special Forest station (巴尔鲁克山塔斯特林场)| 兵团170团 XPCC 170 unit

Yumin County
Halabula (哈拉布拉镇)
Township (乡)
 Halabula Township ( 哈拉布拉乡) | Xindi Township (新地乡) | Aletengyemule Township 阿勒腾也木勒乡   |Jiyeke Township (吉也克乡)| Jiangkesi Township (江克斯乡)
Others
 Chahantuohai Ranch (察汗托海牧场) | 兵团161团 XPCC 161 unit

Hoboksar Mongol Autonomous County
Town
 Hoboksar Town (和布克赛尔镇),  Hebutuoluogai (和什托洛盖镇)
	
Township (乡)
 Xiazigai Township (夏孜盖乡), Tiebukenwusan Township (铁布肯乌散乡), Chagankule Township (查干库勒乡),  Bayinaopao Township (巴音敖包乡),  Motege Township (莫特格乡)

Others
Yikewutubulage Ranch (伊克乌图布拉格牧场),  Nareheuke Ranch (那仁和布克牧场), Bagawutubulage Ranch (巴嘎乌图布拉格牧场),  Busitunge Ranch (布斯屯格牧场), 兵团184团,  Shajihai Mine (砂吉海矿区)

Tumxuk

Turpan Prefecture

Turpan
Subdistrict (街道)
Laocheng Road Subdistrict (老城路街道),  Gaochang Road Subdistrict (高昌路街道)
	
Town (镇)
Qiqunhu (七泉湖镇), Daheyan (Dakheyan) (大河沿镇, داخېيەن)

Township (乡)
Yaer Township (亚尔乡), Aidinghu Township (艾丁湖乡), Putao Township, Xinjiang (葡萄乡), Qiatekale Township (恰特卡勒乡), Erbao Township (Qarghoja) (二堡乡, قارغوجا), Sanbao Township (Astana) (三堡乡, ئاستانە), Shengjin Township (Singgim) (胜金乡, سىڭگىم)

Piqan County
Town (镇)
Piqan Town (鄯善镇), Qiketai (Chiqtim) (七克台镇), Piqan Train Station (鄯善火车站镇),  Lianmuqin (Lamjin) (连木沁镇, لەمجىن), Lukeqin Township (鲁克沁镇)
	
Township (乡)
Bizhan Township (辟展乡), Dongbaza Hui Township (东巴扎回族乡),  Tuyugou Township (吐峪沟乡),  Dalangkan Township (达朗坎乡), Dikan Township (迪坎乡)

Toksun County
镇 Towns:
Toksun Town (Tuokexun;  / ),  Kümüx (Kumishi;  / ), Ke'erjian, Alehui,  Yilahu, Xia, Bostan (Bositan)
	
乡 Township:	
Guolebuyi Township

Wujiaqu

References
新疆维吾尔自治区-行政区划网 www.xzqh.org (in Simplified Chinese). Accessed 2011-04-23

 
Xinjiang
 Townships